Mangaldas M. Pakvasa, મંગળદાસ પક્વાસ (Bombay, 7 May 1882 – 6 November 1968) a freedom fighter and one of the first five Indian Governors, served as the first President of the Bharat Scouts and Guides from 1953 to November 1960.

In the first years after India's independence, leading politicians, including Jawaharlal Nehru, Maulana Abul Kalam Azad and Mangal Das Pakvasa, as well as Scout leaders tried to unify India's Scouts and Guides.

He was Governor of Madhya Pradesh, Bombay and Mysore, and a confidante of Mahatma Gandhi.

His daughter-in-law is Poornima Pakvasa, and his granddaughter is Sonal Mansingh.

References

External links
 http://www.bsgindia.org/
 
 https://web.archive.org/web/20071116175511/http://www.4to40.com/legends/print.asp?id=953
 http://ijg.sagepub.com/cgi/content/abstract/15/1/51?ck=nck
 http://www.ivu.org/congress/wvc60/india.html
 https://web.archive.org/web/20061201015235/http://www.nagpuronline.com/history/modern8.html
 http://www.maharashtra.gov.in/english/gazetteer/WARDHA/his_post_ind.html
 Biography: Mangaldas M. Pakvasa

Governors of Madhya Pradesh

Scouting pioneers

Scouting and Guiding in India
Indian independence activists from Maharashtra
1882 births
1968 deaths
Chairs of the Maharashtra Legislative Council